Mesonia aquimarina is a Gram-negative, aerobic and rod-shaped bacterium from the genus of Mesonia which has been isolated from the coast of the Sea of Japan.

References

Flavobacteria
Bacteria described in 2015